Xavier Le Floch is a French triathlete.

Le Floch won his first World Championships medal at the ITU Long Distance Triathlon World Championships in 2003, held in Ibiza where he finished in third position, claiming the bronze. Two years later in Fredericia he would equal his effort and won his second bronze medal at the same event. He won the silver medal at the 2007 Triathlon Long Distance World Championships in Lorient, beating his fellow country man Sebastien Berlier for the bronze medal, but finished behind Julien Loy, also from France.

References

Living people
French male triathletes
Year of birth missing (living people)
21st-century French people